Ibrar Hussain is a Pakistani politician from Mansehra District. He is currently serving as a member of the Khyber Pakhtunkhwa Assembly belonging to the Qaumi Watan Party.

References

Living people
Pashtun people
Khyber Pakhtunkhwa MPAs 2013–2018
People from Mansehra District
Qaumi Watan Party politicians
Year of birth missing (living people)